The Grantham & Melton Cricket Association (GMCA) is a Sunday League that administer's cricket clubs that participate in its League, Cup and trophy competitions. The league headquarters is based in Grantham, Lincolnshire.

The Grantham & Melton Cricket Association was established in 1984 and membership of the Association was opened to all cricket clubs within a radius of 20 miles from Leicestershire village of Buckminster (situated on the Leicestershire - Lincolnshire border) - referred to as The District. Clubs participating in the league are mainly from the north east of Leicestershire and South Kesteven District of Lincolnshire, but some clubs are from beyond the county boundary, with representatives from Rutland, Nottinghamshire and as far west as Hinckley, Leicestershire, which is only a few kilometers from the Warwickshire border. During the 2021 season, the GMCA held 28 clubs in the League which were divided into 3 Divisions.

The most notable team in recent years is Queniborough. In 2019, after an impressive four-year run as League Champions, Queniborough CC were heading towards their 5th successive League Championship title, only for it to be snatched away by the British Shoe Corporation CC.

Past winners

Performance by season from 2013

References

External links
 

English domestic cricket competitions
Cricket in Rutland
Cricket in Lincolnshire
Cricket in Leicestershire
Cricket in Nottinghamshire
Club cricket